Felicity may refer to:

Places 
 Felicity, California, United States, an unincorporated community
 Felicity, Ohio, United States, a village
 Felicity, Trinidad and Tobago, a community in Chaguanas

Entertainment 
 Felicity (TV series), an American drama
 Felicity (film), a 1978 Australian sexploitation film
 Felicity: An American Girl Adventure, a 2005 TV movie

Other uses 
 Felicity (given name), a list of people and fictional characters
 Felicity (pragmatics), a term used in formal semantics and pragmatics
 Felicity Party, an Islamist Turkish political party founded in 2001
 Felicity Plantation, a historic sugar plantation in Louisiana, United States
 , a Royal Navy Second World War minesweeper
 Felicity, an 18th-century British privateer which captured

See also 
 Felicitas (disambiguation)
 Santa Felicita di Firenze, the second-oldest church in Florence
 The 1982 single "Felicità" and an album of the same name by Italian duo Al Bano and Romina Power